Paul Sturgess (born 25 November 1987) is a British former professional basketball player. Sturgess was the tallest college basketball player in the United States.

Career
Paul "Tiny" Sturgess was "drafted" by the Harlem Globetrotters in August 2011 and is the tallest ever to play for the team.

Sturgess wears a size 19 shoe. Examinations as a teenager revealed that his growth is healthy and not the result of any trouble, but rather he possesses familial tall stature—that is to say his height is genetic. He featured prominently in the 2007 ITV1 television documentary Supersize Kids: Britain's Tallest Teens when he was 19 and playing at Florida Institute of Technology.

Sturgess enjoys playing many other sports and before concentrating on basketball also played golf and football. He declined offers to play professional basketball in Europe, preferring to pursue basketball in the US.

On 1 November 2013, Sturgess was selected by the Springfield Armor in the third round of the 2013 NBA Development League Draft. On 4 November 2013, he was traded to the Texas Legends where he played for the rest of the season.

On 19 November 2014 he was signed by Cheshire Phoenix of the British Basketball League.

Later Sturgess transferred back to the Harlem Globetrotters act, this time being part of the arranged opposition. In the re-formed Washington Generals Sturgess adopted a mask and the pseudonym of "Cager," adopting a villainous role.

Immediately following his basketball career, he became a motivational speaker, mostly for primary school aged children.

References

External links 
Profile at Eurobasket.com
KMG Sports Management Profile
Facebook Page
Twitter account

1987 births
Living people
Centers (basketball)
Cheshire Phoenix players
Florida Tech Panthers men's basketball players
Harlem Globetrotters players
Mountain State Cougars men's basketball players
Sportspeople from Loughborough
Texas Legends players
Washington Generals players